Thân Văn Nhiếp (1804 – 1872), courtesy name Ngưng Chi (凝之), pseudonym Lỗ Đình (魯亭), was the official of the Nguyễn dynasty.


Biography
Thân Văn Nhiếp was born on 28 September 1804 at the capital of Huế. His father was known as an excellent student, by the troubled times of Tayson era so he hasn't take the Civil Service Exams to be the village teacher. When he was 53, or the 4th year of Minh Mệnh era, he was commended to be an official by his acquaintance.

Family
 Father : Thân Văn Quyền.
 Sons : Thân Trọng Trữ, Thân Trọng Huề, Thân Trọng Thuận.

References

External links
 Thân Văn Nhiếp - Nhà quân sự lỗi lạc, vị quan cương trực, thương dân

 

1804 births
1872 deaths
People from Huế
Nguyen dynasty officials